Leegate was a railway station on the Maryport and Carlisle Railway (M&CR) and served this rural district in Cumbria. The station was opened by the M&CR in 1848 and lay in the Parish of Bromfield.

History 
Leegate station was opened by the Maryport & Carlisle Railway in 1848. At grouping in 1923 the M&CR became a part of the London, Midland and Scottish Railway. It was one of a number of lightly used intermediate stations on the M&C line closed to passenger traffic by the British Transport Commission in the years immediately after nationalisation of the British Railways network in 1948.  Services ceased on 5 June 1950, though goods traffic continued to be handled here until 1964.
 
The main Carlisle-Maryport line (completed in 1845) remains open and forms part of the Cumbrian Coast Line between Carlisle and Barrow in Furness.

The station had two through platforms, with substantial station buildings and a signal box.  No trace however remains of the station today.

References 
Notes

Sources
 

Further reading
 
 

Disused railway stations in Cumbria
Former Maryport and Carlisle Railway stations
Railway stations in Great Britain opened in 1848
Railway stations in Great Britain closed in 1950